Greater Poland people is a collection of the ethnographic groups of Polish people, that originate from the region of Greater Poland.

Description 
It is a collection of the ethnographic groups of Polish people, that originate from the region of Greater Poland, which location corresponds to the Greater Poland Voivodeship, Poland. They speak the Greater Poland dialect of Polish language. Modern groups that belong to that category are: Biskupians, Hazaks, Kaliszans, Wieleń Masurians, Pałukians, Poznanians, and Taśtaks. Historical groups that belonged to that category were: Dzierżaks, and Porzeczans.

Demographics 
In the 2011 National Census of Poland, 1515 people declared to identify as Greater Poland people. Of those, 1047, declared it to be their secondary ethnic identification, while 1109, declared to also identify as Polish. Of those who declared to identify as Greater Poland people, 1075 inhabited urban areas, while 439, rural areas.

Citations

Notes

References 

Greater Poland
Greater Poland Voivodeship
Lechites
Polish people
Slavic ethnic groups
Ethnic groups in Poland